Schwall Peak is a peak rising to  in southern Convoy Range, adjacent to Staten Island Heights,  west-northwest of Mount Gunn. It is named for Captain Karen Schwall, the first female U.S. Army Officer in Antarctica, who specialized in logistics, and air and ship operations (1988–91). She became the Logistics Manager with Antarctic Support Associates (1991–96) and was central during the transfer of supply and transportation logistics from the military to civilian support.

Mountains of Victoria Land
Scott Coast